Célio Dias (born 8 February 1993) is a Portuguese judoka.

He competed at the 2016 Summer Olympics in Rio de Janeiro, in the men's 90 kg.

References

External links
 
 

1993 births
Living people
Portuguese male judoka
Olympic judoka of Portugal
Judoka at the 2016 Summer Olympics
European Games competitors for Portugal
Judoka at the 2015 European Games
20th-century Portuguese people
21st-century Portuguese people